Çay is a town of Afyonkarahisar Province in the Aegean region of Turkey. It is the seat of Çay District. Its population is 14,599 (2021). The mayor is Hüseyin Atlı (AKP).

References

Populated places in Afyonkarahisar Province
Çay District
Towns in Turkey